Leasina County is a county in the Western District in American Samoa.

Demographics

Leasina County was first recorded beginning with the 1912 special census. Regular decennial censuses were taken beginning in 1920.

Villages
Aitulagi
Aoloau
Aasu

References 

Populated places in American Samoa